Michael Wiemann (born 9 February 1987 in Beckum) is a German professional footballer who plays as a centre-back.

References

External links
 

Living people
1987 births
German footballers
Association football midfielders
Rot Weiss Ahlen players
FC Hansa Rostock players
SV Wehen Wiesbaden players
2. Bundesliga players
3. Liga players